Ellsworth Ranch Bridge is a truss bridge located  northwest of Armstrong in rural Emmet County, Iowa, United States. The Emmet County Board of Supervisors received a petition in January 1895 for a bridge across the East Fork of the Des Moines River in Lincoln Township. They gave their approval in April of the same year, and in May the board adopted the plans of the King Bridge Company of Cleveland, Ohio. King won the contract for this and two other bridges for $3,400. The Ellsworth Ranch Bridge was completed later in 1895. The bridge includes elements of both the Pratt and Warren configurations in its single span. A minor reconstruction was completed in 1937, and it was listed on the National Register of Historic Places in 1998.

See also
List of bridges documented by the Historic American Engineering Record in Iowa

References

External links

Bridges completed in 1895
Buildings and structures in Emmet County, Iowa
Historic American Engineering Record in Iowa
Road bridges on the National Register of Historic Places in Iowa
Truss bridges in Iowa
National Register of Historic Places in Emmet County, Iowa
Pratt truss bridges in the United States
Metal bridges in the United States
Warren truss bridges in the United States